Alamgir Hossain is a retired Major General of Bangladesh Army. He served as the Group Commander of the Bangladesh Army Aviation Group.

Career 
Hossain was the commander of Army Aviation School in 2016 and under him the first female helicopter pilots of Bangladesh Army graduated from the Army Aviation School.

In March 2020, the Army Aviation School was shifted from Dhaka to Lalmonirhat District in Lalmonirhat Airport. He along with Army Chief of Staff, General Aziz Ahmed, oversaw the transition. In October 2021, he inaugurated a forward operating base for the Army Aviation Group in Chittagong District.

References 

Living people
Bangladesh Army generals
Year of birth missing (living people)